Several ships of the United States Navy have been named Peary or Robert E. Peary, after Robert E. Peary (1856–1920), the Arctic explorer.

  was an  launched in 1943, and struck from the Naval Vessel Register in 1966.
She was struck in 1995 and transferred to the Republic of China. The ship served in the Taiwanese Navy as ROCS Chi Yang (932).

In addition:
  was a Liberty ship, built in 1942 — in a record time of 4 days and 15 hours and 29 minutes. She was scrapped in 1963.
  is a sealift tanker that services McMurdo, Antarctica and Thule, Greenland.

References 

United States Navy ship names